Eugnamptus puncticeps is a species of leaf rolling weevil in the beetle family Attelabidae. It is found in North America.

References

Further reading

 
 

Attelabidae
Articles created by Qbugbot
Beetles described in 1876